Gideon Mer (1894, Panevėžys - 22 March 1961 Rosh Pinna) was an Israeli scientist whose work was mostly concerned with the eradication of malaria. He was the father of Arna Mer-Khamis and the grandfather of Juliano Mer-Khamis.

Biography
Gideon Mer was born in Lithuania, then part of Imperial Russia. He studied medicine in France. He immigrated to Palestine in 1914. During World War I he was a medical officer in the Jewish Legion, a unit of the British Army, and served at Gallipoli, in Palestine, Syria, and Turkey. After the war he returned to Rosh Pinna, a Jewish settlement in the north of Palestine, and his laboratory there eventually became a research station for the study of the bionomics of mosquitoes and methods of malaria control.

Scientific career
With the opening of the Hebrew University of Jerusalem he joined the Department of Preventive Medicine.

In 1927 Israel Jacob Kligler founded the "Malaria Research Station" of the Hebrew University in Rosh Pina, where pioneering field work was carried out relating to the eradication of malaria. Two years later he appointed Dr. Gideon Mer as the station manager and together they published a series of articles on malaria.

During the Second World War Mer served in the British Forces with the rank of colonel and was malaria adviser to Middle East Command. After the war he joined the staff of the new school of medicine and became chief malaria adviser to the Ministry of Health in Israel, of which he was acting director in 1956 and 1957. As malaria was brought under control Professor Mer investigated the control of other insects, particularly the horse-fly, and the Rosh Pinna research station undertook the testing of insecticides and the training of scientists.

References

External links 
 Gideon Mer at Israel War Veterans League
 The Zion Muleteers of Gallipoli (March 1915 – May 1916) by Martin Sugarman (Jewish Virtual Library). Retrieved 21 June 2006.
 Obituary in the British Medical Journal 1961 (29 July 1961), Volume 2, Issue 5247, page 315, doi: 10.1136/bmj.2.5247.315-b
The early contribution of Dr. John Cropper (1864–1916) to the study of malaria in Ottoman Palestine and its eventual eradication. English-language abstract of article by Zalman Greenberg, What is the link between the sister of the "Titanic" and the history of medicine in Palestine?, in "Harefuah", June 2006; 145(6):457-60, 468–9. 
Gideon Mer Collection on the Digital collections of Younes and Soraya Nazarian Library, University of Haifa

See also 

Anopheles
Health care in Israel
Israel Jacob Kligler, colleague and founder of the Malaria Research Station in Rosh Pinna where he appointed Mer as station manager
Juliano Mer-Khamis
Science and technology in Israel

Jewish scientists
Lithuanian emigrants to Mandatory Palestine
Lithuanian Jews
Jews from the Russian Empire
Israeli Jews
Israeli people of Lithuanian-Jewish descent
Malariologists
1894 births
1961 deaths
British Army personnel of World War I
British Army personnel of World War II
Royal Army Medical Corps officers